Hoseyniyeh-ye Olya (also Romanized as Ḩoseynīyeh-ye ‘Olyā; also known as Ḩoseynīyeh-ye Fajer) is a village in Azadeh Rural District, Moshrageh District, Ramshir County, Khuzestan Province, Iran. At the 2006 census, its population was 216, in 39 families.

References 

Populated places in Ramshir County